Eden Congregational Church, also known as Pioneer Chapel, is a historic church building located just north of downtown Hayward in Alameda County, California. The building was listed on the National Register of Historic Places in 2007. The church is still in use by the Eden United Church of Christ (Congregational). A culverted stretch of San Lorenzo Creek runs past it.

History
The building was constructed in 1867. In 1947 the building was moved about one mile north. In 2003 the building was moved again, about 400 feet. The Hayward Area Historical Society was inaugurated in 1956 at the church.

See also

National Register of Historic Places listings in Alameda County, California

References

Further reading
A Century in Eden: A Short History of Eden Congregational Church of Hayward, California, Esther McStay, 1965

External links
Eden Congregational Church at California State Parks website

Buildings and structures in Hayward, California
Churches on the National Register of Historic Places in California
Churches completed in 1867
Churches in Alameda County, California
Congregational churches in California
United Church of Christ churches in California
National Register of Historic Places in Alameda County, California